Inside Job is a live album by trombonist Roswell Rudd. It was recorded on May 21, 1976, at Sam Rivers' Studio Rivbea in New York City, and was released later that year by Freedom Records. On the album, Rudd is joined by trumpeter Enrico Rava, pianist Dave Burrell, bassist Stafford James, and drummer Harold White.

Inside Job was recorded during the loft jazz festival documented on Wildflowers: The New York Loft Jazz Sessions.

Reception

In a review for AllMusic, Ron Wynn described the album as a "solid quintet date."

Jacob Garchik, writing for Ethan Iverson's web site, noted that, in comparison with Rudd's previous releases, "Mysterioso" finds him "really playing quite inside, with a more grounded vocabulary, but still with his characteristic bravado and inventiveness."

Author Todd S. Jenkins stated that the album has an "aura of relaxed inventiveness."

Track listings

 "Sacred Song" (Roswell Rudd) – 8:01
 "Mysterioso" (Thelonious Monk) – 7:42
 "Inside Job" (Roswell Rudd) – 16:26

Personnel 
 Roswell Rudd – trombone
 Enrico Rava – trumpet
 Dave Burrell – piano
 Stafford James – bass
 Harold White – drums

References

1976 live albums
Roswell Rudd live albums
Freedom Records live albums